Justice Reynolds may refer to:

Charles H. Reynolds, associate justice of the Kentucky Supreme Court
Frank B. Reynolds, associate justice of the Montana Supreme Court
John Reynolds (U.S. politician), associate justice of the Illinois Supreme Court
Joseph Reynolds (Rhode Island), associate justice of the Rhode Island Supreme Court
Thomas Reynolds (governor), chief justice of the Illinois Supreme Court